Marcus Pfister (born 30 July 1960 in Bern, Switzerland) is a Swiss author and illustrator of children's picture books.

His Rainbow Fish series of children's picture books, published since 1992, has been a worldwide success. The books have been translated into over 60 languages and have sold over 30 million copies. Decode Entertainment turned the picture books into a 26-episode animated television series of the same name, which has aired on the HBO Family television channel in the United States since 2000.

He uses watercolors to illustrate his children's books. He begins by stretching the watercolor paper over a wooden board. Next, he copies his rough sketches onto the paper in pencil. He is then ready to begin painting. For his backgrounds and blended contours, he uses wet paint on wet paper; this achieves a softer effect. For the finer details, he first lets the painting dry, and then he paints the final picture layer by layer. When the illustration is complete, he cuts the paper from the wooden board.

In February 2017, he was the featured speaker, author, and illustrator at Nepal's first children's literature festival, Bal Sahitya Mahotsav.

Marcus Pfister lives with his wife, Debora, in Bern, Switzerland.

Bibliography

Awards 
 1988: Schweizer Jugendbuchpreis, Nominationlist
 1992: Christopher Award
 1993: Critici in Erba Prize 
 1993: 1. Prize Ulmer Bilderbuchspatz
 1993: Prix spécial des Libraires religieux pour le livre d'enfant, Valence
 1994: Prix de la Jeunesse, Cherbourg
 1995: North Dakota Flicker Tale
 1995: ABBY-Award
 1995: North Carolina Children's Book Award
 1996: Readers' Choice Award, Michigan Reading Association
 1996: Children's Choices (IRA-CBC)
 1997: Christopher Award 
 1997: Steirische Leseeule
 1998: Storytelling World Award

References

External links 
 
 
 The official website of Marcus Pfister
 Featured speaker

Swiss children's writers
Swiss illustrators
Writers who illustrated their own writing
1960 births
Living people
Swiss male writers
Writers from Bern
20th-century Swiss writers
21st-century Swiss writers
20th-century male writers
Artists from Bern